Tropidolophus is a genus of band-winged grasshoppers in the family Acrididae. Tropidolophus is monotypic, with the single species T. formosus, the great crested grasshopper, from North America.

References

Further reading

External links

 

Oedipodinae
Articles created by Qbugbot